Luna, officially the Municipality of Luna, is a 3rd class municipality in the province of La Union, Philippines. According to the 2020 census, it has a population of 37,318 people.

Etymology
The town got its name in order of the Luna brothers: Antonio Luna and Juan Luna.

History
Luna was once called Namacpacan, which is an Ilocano word meaning "one who feeds".

As early as 1587, Namacpacan was recorded as a visita (satellite mission, whose church is manned by non-resident clergy based in the cabecera) of Purao (now Balaoan). It was a settlement along the camino real (national road) from Vigan to Manila, and travelers stopped there to refresh themselves. Since restaurants were not yet in vogue, local families offered the travelers food and lodging, hence the name.

On 18 October 1906, during the terms of Governor Joaquin Luna and Mayor Primitivo Resurrección Novicio, the town was renamed "Luna" through Philippine Commission Act No. 1543. It was the first town that altered its name since the creation of the province in 1850. The change was to honor the famous Luna brothers: Revolutionary General Antonio and Spoliarium painter Juan; their mother, Doña Laureana Novicio Luna, was a native of Namacpacan.

Geography

Barangays
Luna is politically subdivided into 40 barangays. These barangays are headed by elected officials: Barangay Captain, Barangay Council, whose members are called Barangay Councilors. All are elected every three years.

 Alcala
 Ayaoan
 Barangobong
 Barrientos
 Bungro
 Busel-Busel
 Cabalitocan
 Cantoria No. 1
 Cantoria No. 2
 Cantoria No. 3
 Cantoria No. 4
 Carisquis
 Darigayos
 Magallanes
 Magsiping
 Mamay
 Nagrebcan
 Nalvo Norte
 Nalvo Sur
 Napaset
 Oaqui No. 1
 Oaqui No. 2
 Oaqui No. 3
 Oaqui No. 4
 Pila
 Pitpitac
 Rimos No. 1
 Rimos No. 2
 Rimos No. 3
 Rimos No. 4
 Rimos No. 5
 Rissing
 Salcedo
 Santo Domingo Norte
 Santo Domingo Sur
 Sucoc Norte
 Sucoc Sur
 Suyo
 Tallaoen
 Victoria

Luna's poblacion (town center) consists of the four barangays: Victoria, Salcedo, Alcala, and Magallanes.

Climate

Demographics

Economy

Government
Luna, belonging to the first congressional district of the province of La Union, is governed by a mayor designated as its local chief executive and by a municipal council as its legislative body in accordance with the Local Government Code. The mayor, vice mayor, and the councilors are elected directly by the people through an election which is being held every three years.

Elected officials

Tourist attractions

Luna is also known for its pebble beaches, particularly in Nalvo Sur and Darigayos. Beach shades, cottages and resorts are found in these barangays. The municipality is also known for its native delicacies and pottery products which are comparable to San Juan's.

The town is a pilgrimage site as it enshrines the Apo Baket Namacpacan, a wooden Marian image.

On the beach of barangay Victoria rests the ruins of an old Spanish watchtower, locally named as Balauarte. The tower was intended to guard the shores of the town primarily from Muslim and pirate attacks during the Spanish period. During World War II, the tower served as the communication tower post for a temporary airfield for the USAFIP-NL forces. Due to years of quarrying within the site of the tower (1980 to 2000), the coastline receded and sea waves severely damaged the foundation of the tower, which eventually caused major damage to its structure. At present, efforts were initiated to preserve the tower from further damage.

Education
Luna has Public Elementary schools in each barangay except Barangobong. There are 6 public high schools (Luna National Science High School - Central in Barangay Barrientos, LNHS - Rimos and Cantoria Annex; and Oanari National High School) Bungro-Sucoc Integrated School in Bungro, Luna Technical Vocational High School and 1 Private High School (Santa Catalina Academy).

Gallery

References

External links

 [ Philippine Standard Geographic Code]
 Philippine Census Information
 Local Governance Performance Management System

Municipalities of La Union